Oliver Roth (born 1 June 1986) is a German male badminton player. In 2012, he won silver medal at the European Badminton Championships in men's doubles event with his partner Michael Fuchs.

Achievements

European Championships 
Men's doubles

BWF International Challenge/Series 
Men's doubles

 BWF International Challenge tournament
 BWF International Series tournament
 BWF Future Series tournament

References

External links
 

1986 births
Living people
Sportspeople from Munich
German male badminton players